Murphy Himself was a horse that excelled in the sport of eventing, under rider Ian Stark.

Born in 1978, Murphy Himself was first ridden by Ginny Leng. She bought him in Northern Ireland as a supposed four-year-old (although he later turned out to be three), and began eventing him. Under Ginny, Murphy won both Le Touquet and Burghley.
 
However Ginny, being lightweight and small, had a hard time controlling the gelding, who was an incredible puller on cross-country. She had a few bad falls while competing, and her mother and trainer began to worry that she would be seriously hurt.

Ian Stark tried Murphy out in 1988, and he agreed to exchange horses with Leng, Murphy for his horse Griffin. The duo had a terrific success together, completing Badminton several times, receiving the silver medal at the 1990 FEI World Equestrian Games in Stockholm representing the British Team, and competing in the Barcelona Olympics. Murphy was an amazing athlete, possessing speed, stamina, and a fantastic jumping ability.

After a disappointing run at Barcelona, where the ground jury did not pass Murphy in the final horse inspection, the gelding was retired. He was fox hunted a few times, before he had to be put down due to a shattered hock from an injury in the pasture.

Achievements
 1st at Avenches (1984) with Ginny Leng
 1st at 1986 Le Touquet CCI with Ginny Leng
 1st at 1986 Burghley with Ginny Leng
 1st at the 1988 Boekelo event
 Individual and Team silver at the Stockholm World Equestrian Games in 1990
 2nd place at the Badminton Horse Trials in 1991
 Member of the British Eventing Team at the 1992 Barcelona Olympics

Eventing horses
1978 animal births
Irish Sport Horses